Antonin Dubost (6 April 1842 – 16 April 1921) was a French journalist, State Councillor and Senator. He served as President of the French Senate from 1906 to 1920. He was a member of the Democratic Republican Alliance.

Dubost was born at L'Arbresle, Rhône. He was a candidate for President of the French Republic in 1913. As President of the Senate during all of the first World War, he was a strong advocate of forcing Germany to make reparations.

He co-authored a book on the history of legal enforcement, studying the use of imprisonment and deportation. He died in Paris, aged 79.

Political career
In the government of Jean Casimir-Perier, Dubost served as Minister of Justice between 1893 and 1894. He served as Senator for Isère from 1897 to 1921. In January 1906, Armand Fallières stood down as President of the French Senate and Dubost was elected in his place. Fallières went on to become the President of the French Republic. He was serving as a Senator at the time of his death.

He was involved in French politics from the foundation of the French Republic in 1870. He was a Counselor of State, he served as a member of the Chamber of Deputies for seventeen years and as a Senator for twenty-four years.

See also
 List of presidents of the Senate of France

References

1842 births
1921 deaths
People from L'Arbresle
Politicians from Auvergne-Rhône-Alpes
Republican Union (France) politicians
Democratic Republican Alliance politicians
French Ministers of Justice
Members of the 2nd Chamber of Deputies of the French Third Republic
Members of the 3rd Chamber of Deputies of the French Third Republic
Members of the 4th Chamber of Deputies of the French Third Republic
Members of the 5th Chamber of Deputies of the French Third Republic
Members of the 6th Chamber of Deputies of the French Third Republic
French Senators of the Third Republic
Senators of Isère